Maurice Francis Schick (April 17, 1892 in Chicago, Illinois – October 25, 1979 in Hazel Crest, Illinois), was an American baseball player who played outfielder in the Major Leagues in 1917.  He played for the Chicago Cubs. He played in the minors through 1925.

References

1892 births
1979 deaths
Major League Baseball outfielders
Chicago Cubs players
Baseball players from Illinois
Omaha Rourkes players
Richmond Quakers players
Los Angeles Angels (minor league) players
San Francisco Seals (baseball) players
Salt Lake City Bees players
New Orleans Pelicans (baseball) players
San Antonio Bears players